Murchante Fútbol Club is a Spanish football team based in Murchante in the autonomous community of Navarre. Founded in 1953, it plays in Tercera División – Group 15. Its stadium is Estadio San Roque with a capacity of 1,400 seaters.

Season to season

12 seasons in Tercera División

References

External links
Futbolme team profile  
Murchante FC on Futnavarra.es 

Football clubs in Navarre
Association football clubs established in 1953
1953 establishments in Spain